ChristianRock.Net is an internet only Christian rock radio station based in Springfield, Missouri, United States. It started in 1998, and is one of four 24/7 Christian rock stations in the country (alongside RadioU and BrokenFM).

The site plays numerous singles from Christian rock artists, posting a weekly top 30 and an annual top 100. The site often announced upcoming album releases, and has a database of all Christian radio singles by every band they play. They also announce concerts and put up lyrics from various songs.

The site has recently expanded with new stations, including Christian hard rock, Christian hip hop, and Christian power praise. The website plays rock music streamed via RealPlayer, Winamp, and Windows Media Player. And in the fall of 2013 they replaced their Christian hip hop station with a Christian classic rock one.

The site was named the best Internet Radio Network at the Fifth Annual American Christian Music Awards on October 15, 2005.

References

External links
 

Christian rock
Christian websites
Internet properties established in 1998
Online music and lyrics databases
Internet radio stations in the United States
Christian radio stations in the United States
American music websites